The 1994 NCAA Division I baseball tournament was played at the end of the 1994 NCAA Division I baseball season to determine the national champion of college baseball.  The tournament concluded with eight teams competing in the College World Series, a double-elimination tournament in its forty eighth year.  Eight regional competitions were held to determine the participants in the final event.  Each region was composed of six teams, resulting in 48 teams participating in the tournament at the conclusion of their regular season, and in some cases, after a conference tournament.  The forty-eighth tournament's champion was Oklahoma, coached by Larry Cochell.  The Most Outstanding Player was Chip Glass of Oklahoma.

Regionals
The opening rounds of the tournament were played across eight regional sites across the country, each consisting of a six-team field. Each regional tournament is double-elimination. The winners of each regional advanced to the College World Series.

Bold indicates winner.

Atlantic I Regional at Coral Gables, FL

Atlantic II Regional at Tallahassee, FL

Central Regional at Austin, TX

East Regional at Clemson, SC

Mideast Regional at Knoxville, TN

Midwest I Regional at Stillwater, OK

Midwest II Regional at Wichita, KS

South Regional at Baton Rouge, LA

College World Series

Participants

Results

Bracket

The teams in the CWS are divided into two pools of four, with each pool playing a double-elimination format. The winners of the two pools meet in the National Championship game.

Game results

All-Tournament Team
The following players were members of the College World Series All-Tournament Team.

Notable players
 Arizona State: Jacob Cruz, Cody McKay, Antone Williamson
 Auburn: Mark Bellhorn
 Cal State Fullerton: Jeremy Giambi, Bret Hemphill, Mark Kotsay, Dante Powell
 Florida State: Jonathan Johnson, Doug Mientkiewicz, Paul Wilson, Steven Morgan
 Georgia Tech: Nomar Garciaparra, Jay Payton, Brad Rigby, Jason Varitek
 LSU: Russ Johnson, Brett Laxton, Warren Morris, Todd Walker, Ed Yarnall
 Miami (FL): Alex Cora, Danny Graves, Mike Metcalfe, Jay Tessmer
 Oklahoma: Steve Connelly, Damon Minor, Ryan Minor, Russ Ortiz, Mark Redman

See also
 1994 NCAA Division I softball tournament
 1994 NCAA Division II baseball tournament
 1994 NCAA Division III baseball tournament
 1994 NAIA World Series

References

NCAA Division I Baseball Championship
Tournament
Baseball in Austin, Texas